Pikrolimni is a former municipality in the Kilkis regional unit, Greece. Since the Kallikratis Plan for local government reform was implemented in 2011, Pikrolimni is administrated as part and constitutes a municipal unit of the municipality of Kilkis. The municipal unit has an area of 164.06 km2, and its population in the 2011 census was 5,442, down from 7,395 in 2001. The seat of the municipality was Mikrokampos.

The namesake of the region, as well as its most famous attraction, is the salt lake Pikrolimni which has been historically important as a source of natron in antiquity and recognised to this day for its pelo- and balneotherapeutic properties.

The current municipal unit (and former municipality) is subdivided into the following municipal departments:

 Mikrokampos, containing the village Mikrokampos (Μικρόκαμπος, population as of 2011: 731), earlier called Ali Hodzhalar from which chieftains of the Greek Struggle for Macedonia Ioannis Koutsokostas and Evlampios Vyziinos hailed.
 Anthofyto, containing the village Anthofyto (Ανθόφυτο, population as of 2011: 272), earlier name Sari Pazar, near which a prehistoric toumba and settlement named "Anthofyto A" has been discovered.
 Mavroneri, containing villages:
Mavroneri (Μαυρονέρι, population as of 2011: 535), originally the Turkish-inhabited Kara Bunar, repopulated in 1928 by Greek refugees from Asia Minor after the population exchange as a result of the Treaty of Lausanne.
Ano Apostoloi (Άνω Απόστολοι, population as of 2011: 267), earlier name just Apostoloi or Paliokklisia (15th century AD), near the ancient Macedonian town of Morrylos, home of a cult of Asclepius.
Mesoi Apostoloi (Μέσοι Απόστολοι, population as of 2011: 113), founded in 1924 near Apostoloi by Greek refugees from Asia Minor and the Pontus.
 Neo Agioneri, containing the village Neo Agioneri (Νέο Αγιονέρι, population as of 2011: 1176), also known as Nea Varlantza/Verlatza, founded in 1926 by Cappadocian Greek refugees from Cappadocia.
Neo Gynaikokastro, containing villages:
Neo Gynaikokastro (Νέο Γυναικόκαστρο, population as of 2011: 578), older names Avret Hisar and Nea Dimitra, in the vicinity of the 14th century castle built by Andronikos III Palaiologos and since 1926 populated by Greek refugees from Eastern Thrace (Çatalca district) and the Caucasus.
Vakoufi (Βακούφι, population as of 2011: 16), first officially listed as a settlement in 1940.
Kato Apostoloi (Κάτω Απόστολοι, population as of 2011: 408), locally also called Thrakiotiko, founded in 1922 near Apostoloi by Greek refugees from Eastern Thrace (hence the local name).
Kokartza (Κοκάρτζα, population as of 2011: 48), populated in 1928 by Greek refugees from Asia Minor.

 Palaio Agioneri, containing the village Palaio Agioneri (Παλαιό Αγιονέρι, population as of 2011: 886), earlier name just Agioneri or Verlatza, repopulated in the early 1920s by Pontic Greek refugees mainly from the Caucasus.
Xylokeratia, containing villages:
Xylokeratia (Ξυλοκερατιά, population as of 2011: 273), older name Hadzhilar, located near the ruins of the ancient city Clitae (centre of ancient natron production from lake Pikrolimni) and by the early 20th centruty inhabited by Bulgarians and Turks before the population exchanges in the aftermath of the Balkan and Greco-Turkish wars; afterwards repopulated by Greek refugees mostly from Eastern Rumelia (southern Bulgaria).
Mpakeika (Μπακαίικα, population as of 2011: 25), near a different prehistotic settlement (location Lofos Karditsa), first officially listed as a settlement in 1961.
Pikrolimni (Πικρολίμνη, population as of 2011: 25), previously known as Gyolbash, originally Bulgarian-inhabited until repopulated by Greek refugees from Asia Minor, Eastern Thrace and the Pontus as a result of population exchange.

Further reading 

 Ministry of Culture of Greece. Proclamation of new archaeological sites and redefinition of existing sites' boundaries in Kilkis prefecture (in Greek) maintained as part of the "Permanent List of Archaeological Sites and Monuments of Greece" by the Directorate of the National Registry of Monuments; contains information about all mentioned archaeological sites in the Pikrolimni region
 Greek National Documentation Centre (EKT). Name Changes of Settlements in Greece 1913-1996 (in English) maintained as part of the "PANDEKTIS - Digital Thesaurus of Primary Sources for Greek History and Culture" project of the NHRF; searchable database of name changes, including all settlements of Pikrolimni
 Lithoxoou, Dimitris. Catalogue of Name Changes of Settlements in Macedonia, Greece, 1919-1971 (in Greek) archived 2012-06-30; additionally to name changes also contains information about the ethnic makeup of villages after population exchanges
 Kănchov, Vasil (1900). Македония. Етнография и статистика (in Bulgarian) Sofia: Bulgarian Academy of Sciences; detailed investigation on the ethnic character of villages in Macedonia at the start of the 20th century (before population exchanges)
 Dimitriadis, Vasilis (1980). Φορολογικές κατηγορίες των χωριών της Θεσσαλονίκης κατά την Τουρκοκρατία (in Greek) Μακεδονικά, 20(1), 375-462. doi:https://doi.org/10.12681/makedonika.413; investigation on taxation regime and other aspects of everyday life in villages of the kaza of Thessaloniki during the Ottoman period

References

Populated places in Kilkis (regional unit)
Kilkis
Kilkis (regional unit)